Central Coast Adventist School is an independent Seventh-day Adventist co-educational early learning, primary and secondary day school, located in Erina, on the Central Coast of New South Wales, Australia.

Founded in 1969, the school is a part of the Seventh-day Adventist education system, the world's second largest Christian school system. John Hammond was the first principal with 18 students. The school has grown to over 900 students today.

History 
The school was established on former farm land which was donated to the local church for the establishment of the school. Local church member, Kevin Chugg, built two classrooms at a total cost of $16,000.

The school buildings have also changed over time. As early as 1995 the school only had two buildings, the white building at the top of the school (which has been removed) and the old primary school rooms (which have been removed).

Gallery

See also

 List of Seventh-day Adventist secondary schools
 List of non-government schools in New South Wales

References 

1969 establishments in Australia
Adventist secondary schools in Australia
Educational institutions established in 1969
Private secondary schools in New South Wales
Private primary schools in New South Wales
Adventist primary schools in Australia
Central Coast (New South Wales)